Lars Thomas Ored Oredsson (born 19 December 1946, in Stockholm) is a Swedish actor and comedian. He studied at Calle Flygare Teaterskola and Swedish National Academy of Mime and Acting.

Selected filmography
1978 – Bomsalva
1980 – Der Mann, der sich in Luft auflöste
1987 – Varuhuset (TV series)
1990 – Den svarta cirkeln (TV series)
1991 – Barnens detektivbyrå
1992 – Hassel – De giriga
1994 – Tre Kronor (TV series)
2000 – Järngänget
2000 – Judith (TV series)
2005 – Van Veeteren – Carambole
2006 – Van Veeteren – Moreno och tystnaden
2007 – Beck – I guds namn
2007 – Beck – Gamen
2014 – Crimes of Passion (TV series)
2017–2020 – Rebecka Martinsson (TV series)

References

External links

1946 births
Living people
Swedish male actors
Swedish stand-up comedians
20th-century Swedish people